Nikolay Vladimirovich Kulemin (born 14 July 1986) is a Russian professional ice hockey player who is currently playing for Salavat Yulaev Ufa of the Kontinental Hockey League (KHL). Kulemin previously played in the National Hockey League (NHL) for the Toronto Maple Leafs and New York Islanders, the former of which drafted him in the second round, 44th overall, in the 2006 NHL Entry Draft.

Playing career
On 25 May 2007, Kulemin signed a three-year contract with the Toronto Maple Leafs, but stayed in Russia for the 2007–08 season on a "handshake agreement" between the Maple Leafs and Metallurg Magnitogorsk of the Kontinental Hockey League (KHL). During the early stages of the 2008–09 season, his first in the NHL, Kulemin found chemistry on a line with teammates Niklas Hagman and Mikhail Grabovski. Kulemin's first NHL goal occurred in his first NHL game, against the Detroit Red Wings, on goaltender Chris Osgood, in Toronto's 2008–09 season opener on 9 October 2008. The goal ended up as the game winner in a 3–2 Toronto win. Near the end of the season, after the trade of Leafs forward Nik Antropov, Kulemin was used mainly on a line with Grabovski and Alexei Ponikarovsky. In a game against the Montreal Canadiens on 21 March 2009, soon after the line was created, Kulemin posted a career-high three points (one goal and two assists) in a 5–2 Toronto win. Notably, Ponikarovsky, a Ukrainian, helped Kulemin become more comfortable in North America by translating and serving as a mentor on and off the ice.

Kulemin showed a small offensive improvement in his second season, going from 15 goals and 31 points to 16 goals and 36 points. His 16 goals were tied for fourth on the Maple Leafs by season's end, and his 36 points were fifth. In late January, he was selected as a reserve by Russia for the upcoming 2010 Winter Olympics should an injury occur during the tournament. On 2 July 2010, Kulemin signed a two-year contract worth $2.35 million per year with the Maple Leafs.

The 2010–11 season was a big leap for Kulemin. Playing on a line with Mikhail Grabovski and Clarke MacArthur, Kulemin posted new career highs in goals and points. On 5 April 2011, Kulemin became the first Russian-born Toronto Maple Leaf to score 30 goals in a season since Alexander Mogilny scored 33 in 2002–03. Kulemin, along with Mats Sundin, Phil Kessel, James van Riemsdyk, Mogilny, Nazem Kadri,  William Nylander, John Tavares, and Auston Matthews, are the only Leafs to score 30 or more since the 1999–2000 season. He also scored a career-high four points against the Atlanta Thrashers on 7 January 2011.

Despite the prior season's progress, Kulemin dropped to 7 goals over 70 games in 2011–12, with his shooting percentage falling from 17.3% to 6.5%. Despite his setbacks offensively, Kulemin was re-signed by Toronto on 20 July 2012 to another two-year contract, worth $2.8 million per year. During the 2012–13 NHL lockout, he returned to the Metallurg Magnitogorsk, where he scored 38 points in 36 games. Upon the lockout ending he returned to Toronto, and scored 7 goals and 23 points in 48 games. In the 2013 Stanley Cup playoffs, Kulemin managed only 1 assist in 7 games as the Leafs were eliminated by the Boston Bruins.

In the 2013–14 season, Kulemin was selected to play in the 2014 Winter Olympics for Russia, held in Sochi. With the Maple Leafs, Kulemin managed only 9 goals and a career low 11 assists for a mere 20 points. Over 70 games he notched only 81 shots, a far cry from his 173 shots in 2010–11.

On 2 July 2014, as a free agent, Kulemin left the Maple Leafs after six seasons to sign a four-year contract with the New York Islanders. Kulemin joined the Islanders along with his Maple Leafs linemate and friend Mikhail Grabovski, making it known to teams during free agency that they wanted to sign together. He was able to somewhat rekindle his offensive touch, scoring 15 goals and 31 points in his first season with New York. On 25 April 2015, Kulemin scored what was thought to be the final NHL game-winning goal at the Nassau Veterans Memorial Coliseum in Game 6 of the Eastern Conference Quarterfinals of the 2015 playoffs. This distinction now belongs to Anthony Beauvillier who scored the overtime winner in Game 6 of the 2021 Stanley Cup Semi-Final against Tampa Bay.

In the 2015–16 season, Kulemin dropped back to only 9 goals and 22 points with the Islanders, managing only 92 shots in 81 games. In the 2016 playoffs, he added 4 points in 11 games.

After concluding his contract with the Islanders, on 4 July 2018, Kulemin left the NHL after ten seasons to return to Metallurg Magnitogorsk, signing a three-year contract.

As a free agent following the conclusion of his contract with Mettlaurg, Kulemin left as a free agent and was signed to a one-year deal to continue in the KHL with Salavat Yulaev Ufa on 27 August 2021.

Personal
Kulemin is married to Natasha and they have two children; their son, Aleks, was born on 20 March 2009, and their daughter was born on 10 February 2012.

Career statistics

Regular season and playoffs

International

Honours and awards

Individual awards
Russian Super League MVP:  2007

Team awards
Tampere Cup:  2006
Česká Pojišťovna Cup:  2006
Karjala Cup:  2006
Channel One Cup:  2006
Russian Super League championship:  2007

References

External links

 
RussianPropects Profile

1986 births
Living people
Metallurg Magnitogorsk players
New York Islanders players
Ice hockey players at the 2014 Winter Olympics
Olympic ice hockey players of Russia
People from Magnitogorsk
Russian ice hockey left wingers
Salavat Yulaev Ufa players
Toronto Maple Leafs draft picks
Toronto Maple Leafs players
Toronto Marlies players
Sportspeople from Chelyabinsk Oblast